Canidia cincticornis is a species of longhorn beetles of the subfamily Lamiinae. It was described by Thomson in 1857, and is known from Nicaragua and Costa Rica.

References

Beetles described in 1857
Acanthocinini